The Pike-Sheldon House, located at 406 S. 3rd St. in Monmouth, Illinois, is a historic home and the birthplace of lawman Wyatt Earp. The house features an Upright and Wing plan with a Greek Revival design; its two-story upright section was constructed circa 1841, while its one-story wing was added circa 1868. The Upright and Wing plan was popular among houses built in the early settlement of the Midwest. The home's Greek Revival elements include a wide banded frieze, sash windows, and cornice returns. Wyatt Earp was born in the home in 1848, while his aunt was renting the house. The house is one of the oldest homes in Monmouth and one of only two Upright and Wing homes remaining in the city.

The house was added to the National Register of Historic Places on August 12, 1999.

The Wyatt Earp Birthplace Museum now occupies the house.

References

External links
 Wyatt Earp Birthplace

Houses on the National Register of Historic Places in Illinois
Museums in Warren County, Illinois
Historic house museums in Illinois
Houses in Warren County, Illinois
National Register of Historic Places in Warren County, Illinois
1841 establishments in Illinois
Houses completed in 1841